The 2018 Big South Conference women's soccer tournament was the postseason women's soccer tournament for the Big South Conference held from October 27 through November 4, 2018. The quarterfinals of the tournament were held at campus sites, while the semifinals and final took place at Sportsplex at Matthews in Matthews, North Carolina. The eight-team single-elimination tournament consisted of three rounds based on seeding from regular season conference play. The High Point Panthers were the defending champions, but they were eliminated from the 2018 tournament with a 2–0 quarterfinal loss to the Radford Highlanders. The Radford Highlanders won the tournament with a 1–0 win over Gardner–Webb in the final. The conference tournament title was the sixth for the Radford women's soccer program and the sixth for head coach Ben Sohrabi.

Bracket

Source:

Schedule

Quarterfinals

Semifinals

Final

Statistics

Goalscorers 

3 Goals
 Jasmine Casarez - Radford

2 Goals
 Stina Kleppe - Gardner-Webb

1 Goal
 Jana Bruan - Gardner-Webb
 Sidney Doherty - Charleston Southern
 Abbie Ellis - USC Upstate
 Jane Everett - Radford
 Alexa Genas - Campbell
 Maggie Mae Everett - Gardner-Webb
 Jada Newton - Gardner-Webb
 Rosie O'Neal - Campbell
 Nelia Perez - Radford

All-Tournament team

Source:

See also 
 Big South Conference
 2018 NCAA Division I women's soccer season
 2018 NCAA Division I Women's Soccer Tournament
 2018 Big South Conference Men's Soccer Tournament

References 

2018 Big South Conference women's soccer season
Big South Conference Women's Soccer Tournament